Mohammad Sadeq Amani  ( محمدصادق) was an Iranian political activist . He was a member of both Fada'iyan-e Islam and the Islamic Coalition Party. Amani was involved in the 1964 assassination of Hassan Ali Mansur, Prime Minister of Iran during the Shah Mohammad Reza Pahlavi administration. He was later executed by the regime for his part in the assassination.

Life and career 
Born in 1930 in Tehran, Iran, Amani was an Iranian Shia Muslim who worked in the local market and was a student of theology. He was a Mujtahid (a person accepted as an original authority in Islamic law) and was known as a teacher of ethics.

In his youth, Amani joined the group of Fada'iyan-e Islam. He had a political tendency towards Navvab Safavi and Kashani. He was a founder and active member of the group Shi'ayan.

1963 demonstrations in Iran 
Sadeq Amani had a significant role in organizing the 1963 demonstrations in Iran and helped plan the 1964 assassination of Hassan Ali Mansur, the prime minister of the Shah. Amani  was arrested after Mansur's assassination and was executed by the regime of the Shah on June 16, 1965.

See also 
 Fada'iyan-e Islam
 Islamic Coalition Party
 Navvab Safavi
 Mohammad Bokharaei

References 

Executed Iranian people
Iranian prisoners sentenced to death
Islamic Coalition Party politicians
Iranian Islamists
People from Tehran
1930 births
1965 deaths